Edgardo Chaire Chavero (born 18 April 1977) is a Mexican politician from the National Action Party. From 2011 to 2012 he served as Deputy of the LXI Legislature of the Mexican Congress representing Guanajuato.

References

1977 births
Living people
Politicians from Guanajuato
National Action Party (Mexico) politicians
21st-century Mexican politicians
Deputies of the LXI Legislature of Mexico
Members of the Chamber of Deputies (Mexico) for Guanajuato